The 1924–25 NCAA championships were contested by the NCAA during the 1924–25 collegiate academic school year, its fifth year of hosting championships, to determine the team and individual national champions of two sponsored sports.

Before the introduction of the separate University Division and College Division before the 1955–56 school year, the NCAA only conduced a single national championship for each sport. Women's sports were not added until 1981–82.

Championships

Season results

Team titles, by university

Cumulative results

Team titles, by university

References 

1924 in American sports
1925 in American sports